Yacine Abdessadki (born 1 January 1981) is a Moroccan former professional footballer who played as winger.

Career
Born in Nice, Provence-Alpes-Côte d'Azur, Abdessadki started his professional career at Strasbourg where he went on to spend most of his career. He arrived at Strasbourg age 17, and after a loan spell with Grenoble Foot 38 in Ligue 2, returned to star for the club. While at Strasbourg Abdessadki played as they won the 2005 Coupe de la Ligue Final.

In 2008, Abdessadki moved across the border to Germany signing with Bundesliga side SC Freiburg. He was involved in an altercation where he bit FC St. Pauli player Thomas Meggle in an April 2009 league match.

In December 2011, his contract with SC Freiburg was cancelled by the club after he was accused of stealing shampoo from a hotel room.

On 29 June 2015, he returned to football, signing a contract with the French lower-league club SR Colmar.

References

External links
 

1981 births
Living people
French sportspeople of Moroccan descent
Riffian people
Moroccan footballers
Association football wingers
Morocco international footballers
Ligue 1 players
Ligue 2 players
Bundesliga players
2. Bundesliga players
SC Toulon players
RC Strasbourg Alsace players
Grenoble Foot 38 players
Toulouse FC players
SC Freiburg players
Moroccan expatriate footballers
Moroccan expatriate sportspeople in Germany
Expatriate footballers in Germany